Daraban is a tehsil located in Dera Ismail Khan District, Khyber Pakhtunkhwa, Pakistan. Daraban Kalan, pronounced "Draban" is to be distinguished from Daraban Khurd, a village lying to the east of Dera Ismail Khan city.

Etymology 
There are various theories as to the origin of the word Daraban. The word "Daraban", according to some accounts actually came from term "Durruh-Bund" which means the closed pass. Centuries back the people who settled down in present-day Draban aimed to close the pass which connected Draban with Sherani hills. Sherani hill tribe in those days was in habit of pillaging villages in Damaan below their hills. The term "Durruh_Bund" in due course of time became the name of the village of people living in present-day Draban. "Durruh-Bund" got shortened as Daraban and now in further reduced form the word is pronounced as Draban. According to another popular narrative the words Daraban and Darazinda, the chief town of F.R Sherani originate in similar sound, are Persian in origin and can be traced back to Dara Shikoh, a son of Mughal king Shajahan. Daraban as per this account gets translated as Dara's forest, here came to hunt wild animals, while Darazianda was his zindan, or prison, there he kept his prisoners. The former account as to the origin of the name of the town seems more plausible and is very much attested by the history of enmity and hostility between Sherani tribe and Saraiki people, possessors of Draban. Saraiki tribes have been living here for almost hundreds of years.

British era and its remains 
The region constituting present day Khyber-Pakhtunkhwa was eventually colonised by the British. The effects and remains of colonialism could be observed even this remote part of Dera Ismail khan. The British built chains of Frontier Constabulary forts in the region to hold in check independent Pashtoons of the mountains. Darazinda, Draban, and Zarkani have FC forts built by the British. From these forts the British launched punitive expeditions in the mountains. Daraban boasts an FC fort, Assistant Commissioner court and large colonial style rest house, all relics of the Raj . Within the compound of the Assistant commissioner residence lies the grave of a British officer who died in action in Zarkani in colonial times. The British also built two bridges over the two perennial water streams flowing from the Sulaiman Mountains. The larger one was known locally as Kali Pul, and smaller one was called Sawi Pul . Kali Pul some years ago was sold in auction after the government replaced it with a new, modern one. The British connected Dera Ismail Khan through telephone with FR Sherani and Zhob Balochistan. This telephone line is no longer in service and its poles and wires lying in utter neglect continue to be stolen by thieves.

Languages and ethnicity 
Draban is a melting point of cultures and languages. The coming of the Pashtoons over the centuries in this part of the land has resulted in their interaction with the local Saraikis. Now things have come to such a pass that both linguistic groups have become bilingual. Pashtoons speak Saraiki like native speakers and the Saraikis speak Pasthto fluently. It is only Nasir and Sherani people who speak only Pashto. Miankhels and other Pashtoons speak fluent Saraiki in addition to their own native tongue. Centuries of close interaction of Pasthto with Saraiki have given the former language a unique Saraiki touch. And Saraiki has under the influence of Pasthto acquired a unique flavour of its own. Pashto speakers constitute the majority of the region and own vast tracts of agricultural land and have dominant political influence in the area. Ethnic and racial strife between Pashtoons and Saraikis is non-existent,.

Geographic location and communication 

Daraban lies at the foot of Sulaiman mountains. The peaks of Takht e Sulaiman, which can be seen from Daraban, are a part of myth and folklore of the people who live in whole of Damaan. Daraban enjoys privileged geographic position in the whole of neighbouring region and this accounts for its burgeoning trade and population. The town is connected by road with neighbouring towns of Darazinada, Musazai, and Chaudwan. The inhabitants of these towns have to pass through Daraban while journeying to Dera Ismail Khan city. Daraban also lies on the national highway connecting Khyber-Pakhtunkhwa with Baluchistan. The highway was built by National Highway authority almost eight years ago and is playing vital role in the development and progress of this region. Traveling to Zhob and Quetta from Khyber-Pakhtunkhwa was quite difficult before the construction of this highway. Travelers had to suffer a long ordeal in travelling to Balochistan through a much longer route via the province of Punjab and Sindh. The highway has also resulted in increase of trade and commerce in Daraban and areas around it.

Educational institutions 

In terms of literacy rate and educational standards, Draban and its bordering areas lag behind the rest of Dera Ismail khan. A high school was established in the town in 1953, but only a decade ago it was upgraded to the status of higher secondary school.

Places worth visiting around Draban 
The town of Draban itself offers little in terms of sightseeing, tourism or adventure. So it is neighbouring mountains where mostly people end up in their quest for enjoyment, recreation and fun. Near Darazinda, Peer Ghundai, another sight of abundant waterfalls and scenery is a major attraction. But it is trip to Takht-e-Sulaiman which is most common excursion for the people. The trip to this 3400 M high summit is undertaken in summer and usually takes two days journey on foot over difficult mountain terrain. On the summit there is a religious shrine and a Takht related with prophet Sulaiman. To the south of Draban lies the town of Musa Zai Sharif boasting an important khankah of Nashbaniah Sufi tradition. The shrine houses tombs of Dost Muhammad Qandhari, Usman Damani, Sirjuddin, Ibrahim, Ismail. The shrine of Musa zai is quite well known in the whole region and the devotees visit it from all over Pakistan, Afghanistan India and even from Arab countries. Khankah of Shaikh Ghulam Yaseen Sahib, known as Agah Sahib and tombs of his sons Faiz Muhammad Sahib, Muhammad Din Sahib is well known and people from all over of the Pakistan come to visit their tombs.

References

External links
http://www.dawn.com/weekly/dmag/archive/021201/dmag9.htm
http://draban.blogspot.com/

Populated places in Dera Ismail Khan District
Tehsils of Khyber Pakhtunkhwa